Barbershop may refer to:

 A place where barbers work
 Barbershop music, an a cappella musical style
 Barbershop quartet, a quartet of singers

Barbershop franchise
 Barbershop (franchise), an American comedy film franchise
 Barbershop (film), a 2002 American comedy film directed by Tim Story
Barbershop (soundtrack), a soundtrack album from the film 
 Barbershop 2: Back in Business, a 2004 American comedy film directed by Kevin Rodney Sullivan
Barbershop 2: Back in Business (soundtrack), a soundtrack album from the film
 Barbershop: The Next Cut, a 2016 American comedy film directed by Malcolm D. Lee
Barbershop: The Next Cut (soundtrack), a soundtrack album from the film
 Barbershop (TV series), a 2005 sitcom based on the films

Other uses
 Barbershop Canyon, a valley in Arizona
 Barbershop in Germany, the association for barbershop music in Germany
 The Barbershop, an 1894 American short narrative film directed by William K.L. Dickson and William Heise
 Barbershop paradox, a historically interesting logic problem by Lewis Carroll
 Kapsalon (English: "barbershop") is a Dutch fast food